Quanah, Acme and Pacific Railway (QA&P) was a  freight railroad that operated between the Red River and Floydada, Texas, from 1902 until it was merged into the Burlington Northern Railroad in 1981.

History 
On May 3, 1902, the line was incorporated as the Acme, Red River and Northern Railway. The founders' original, never-realized plans were to extend the line  from the Red River to El Paso, Texas.

On January 28, 1909, the railroad assumed the name of the Quanah, Acme and Pacific. One of the largest shareholders was Harry Koch.

In 1911, the St. Louis–San Francisco Railway assumed control of the QA&P.

In 1913, the eight-mile long Motley County Railroad was chartered with money from more than ninety investors. It ran through unfenced ranch lands in Motley County before joining the QA&P at Roaring Springs. This railroad continued to operate until 1936.

Freight stops on the QA&P were in the Red River, Carnes, Quanah, Acme, Lazare, Swearingen, Paducah, Narcisso, Summit (Motley County), Russellville, Roaring Springs, MacBain, Dougherty, Boothe Spur, and Floydada.

On June 8, 1981, the QA&P was merged by owner Burlington Northern Railroad, which had merged the QA&P's corporate parent, the St. Louis–San Francisco Railway, on November 21, 1980.

The Burlington Northern Railroad abandoned the former QA&P line west of Paducah in 1982.

Traffic 
QA&P's traffic consisted of overhead freight—between the St. Louis–San Francisco Railway at the Red River and the Atchison, Topeka and Santa Fe Railway at Floydada—and some general commodities. Starting in the 1960s, the QLA freight train via Floydada was scheduled to arrive Los Angeles 38½-to-40 hours after leaving Tulsa. The railroad's traffic was cut back after 1973 when overhead trade took a shorter route via Avard, OK.

In 1925, QA&P reported 8 million ton-miles of revenue freight on 91 miles of line; in 1944, it had 51 million and in 1967, 130 million, both on 120 route-miles.

References 

Defunct Texas railroads
Railway companies established in 1909
Railway companies disestablished in 1981
Predecessors of the St. Louis–San Francisco Railway
Former Class I railroads in the United States